Michael Jermain Nottingham (born 14 April 1989) is a professional footballer who plays as a defender for Accrington Stanley. Born in England, he represents the Saint Kitts and Nevis national football team.

Club career
Nottingham started his career in the Northern Premier League Division One South with Romulus and Castle Vale JKS of the Midland Football Combination. In 2011 he also had a short spell at Southern Football League Premier Division side Redditch United. In October 2011 he signed for Midland Football Alliance side Gresley and made his debut against Causeway United. The side finished as champions in the 2011–12 season and were promoted to the Northern Premier League Division One South and Nottingham won the Gresley Directors' Award. In his second season with the club he again won the Directors' Award and was named in the Northern Premier League Division One South Team of the Year. He made a total of eighty appearances in all competitions for Gresley, scoring nine goals.

In the summer of 2013 he stepped up a couple of divisions to sign for National League North side Solihull Moors. Nottingham made thirty-nine appearances and scored six goals and was an integral part of the side in the 2015–16 season as Solihull finished as champions. He swept up a number of awards at the end of the campaign, including Supporters' Player of the Season and Players' Player of the Season. He was also named in the National League North Team of the Year for the first time. It proved to be his last season with the club after making over a hundred appearances.

In May 2016, following Solihull's promotion to the National League, he decided to join newly-promoted National League North side Salford City for personal reasons as he wanted to be further north to live with his partner. He made 44 league appearances and scored ten goals and was named Supporters' Player of the Year, as well as being named in the National League North Team of the Year for the second-consecutive season. In his second season he won the National League North for the second time as Salford were promoted to the National League as champions. He scored four goals in 42 appearances in all competitions and was also named in the Team of the Year for the third season running.

On 21 May 2018, after Nottingham's contract with Salford City had ended, he joined League One club Blackpool on a two-year deal.

Nottingham signed for Crewe Alexandra on a six-month loan deal on 16 January 2020, and made his Crewe debut two days later in a 1-0 win over Cheltenham Town at Gresty Road. He scored his first Crewe goal, the equaliser in a 1-1 draw at Exeter City, on 3 March 2020. Crewe manager David Artell had hoped to sign Nottingham, but Blackpool manager Neil Critchley triggered an option to automatically extend Nottingham's contract.

On 9 October 2020, Nottingham joined Accrington Stanley in a three-year deal.

International career
Born in Birmingham, West Midlands, Nottingham qualified for Saint Kitts and Nevis through his heritage. He received his first call-up to the national side in June 2017 for two friendlies in Europe against Armenia and Georgia. He made his debut on 4 June in Yerevan playing the first 68 minutes before he was substituted off in their 5–0 defeat to Armenia. Three days later he came on as a late substitute in the 3–0 defeat to Georgia in Tbilisi.

Personal life
Nottingham grew up in Aston, near to Aston Villa. He attended Manor Park Primary School. Whilst playing as a semi-professional for Solihull Moors, he also worked as a vehicle marshall for Balfour Beatty.

Career statistics

Club

International

Honours
Gresley
Midland Football Alliance: 2011–12

Solihull Moors
National League North: 2015–16
Birmingham Senior Cup: 2015–16

Salford City
National League North: 2017–18

Individual
Northern Premier League Division One South Team of the Year: 2012–13
National League North Team of the Year: 2015–16, 2016–17, 2017–18

References

External links

1989 births
Living people
Footballers from Birmingham, West Midlands
Saint Kitts and Nevis footballers
Saint Kitts and Nevis international footballers
English footballers
English sportspeople of Saint Kitts and Nevis descent
Association football defenders
Romulus F.C. players
Redditch United F.C. players
Gresley F.C. players
Solihull Moors F.C. players
Salford City F.C. players
National League (English football) players
Northern Premier League players
Blackpool F.C. players
Crewe Alexandra F.C. players
Accrington Stanley F.C. players